Tournay may refer to:

 Tournai, a municipality in the Belgian province of Hainaut, Wallonia
 Tournai-sur-Dive, a commune in the Orne department in northwestern France
 Tournay, Hautes-Pyrénées, a commune of the Hautes-Pyrénées département in southwestern France
 Tournay-sur-Odon, a commune of the Calvados département in northwestern France
 Tournay, Wallonia, a district of the municipality of Neufchâteau, Luxembourg Province, Belgium